Eilema argentea is a moth of the subfamily Arctiinae first described by Arthur Gardiner Butler in 1878. It is found on Madagascar.

Subspecies
Eilema argentea argentea
Eilema argentea infuscata Toulgoët, 1960

References

Moths described in 1878
argentea